Yesterdays is the first compilation album by the English progressive rock band Yes, released in February 1975 on Atlantic Records. It consists of material previously recorded for the band's first two studio albums, Yes (1969) and Time and a Word (1970), "Dear Father" their 1970 B-side of the single "Sweet Dreams", and the full version of their cover of "America" by Simon & Garfunkel. "America" was previously unreleased on a Yes album having only been released on an Atlantic Records' sampler album "The New Age of Atlantic" in 1972 (the inner sleeve note that it was on that album's predecessor "The Age of Atlantic" is incorrect). Yesterdays is the last Yes album to feature cover artwork by Roger Dean until the 1980 album Drama.

Track listing

Personnel
Jon Anderson – lead vocal, backing vocals, percussion
Peter Banks – electric guitar (2-8)
Steve Howe – electric guitar ("America")
Chris Squire – bass guitar, backing vocals
Tony Kaye – keyboards (2-8)
Rick Wakeman – keyboards ("America")
Bill Bruford – drums, percussion

Charts
Album

Single

References

 "Top Pop Albums 1955-2001", Joel Whitburn, c.2002

Albums with cover art by Roger Dean (artist)
Albums produced by Eddy Offord
Yes (band) compilation albums
1975 compilation albums
Atlantic Records compilation albums